Selegie Arts Centre is an "arts home" on 30 Selegie Road which houses the Photographic Society of Singapore.

History
The building was originally an Indian coffee-shop with residential units located on the upper floors. The building was gazetted for conservation in October 1994 and was acquired by the National Arts Council under the Arts Housing Scheme to house the Photographic Society of Singapore. The arts centre was opened on 15 November 1996, with an art gallery on the second floor named after Loke Wan Tho and his younger sister Yuen-Peng McNeice for their contributions to the Photographic Society of Singapore.

References

1996 establishments in Singapore
Buildings and structures in Singapore